Timbellus richeri is a species of sea snail, a marine gastropod mollusk in the family Muricidae, the murex snails or rock snails.

Description
The shell grows to a length of 30 mm.

Distribution
This marine species is found in the Coral Sea and off New Caledonia.

References

 Merle D., Garrigues B. & Pointier J.-P. (2011) Fossil and Recent Muricidae of the world. Part Muricinae. Hackenheim: Conchbooks. 648 pp. page(s): 133
 Houart, R. (2012). Timbellus richeri complex (Gastropoda: Muricidae) in the southwest Pacific. Novapex. 13 (3-4): 91-101.

External links
 
  Houart, R. (1987). Description of three new muricid gastropods from the south-western Pacific Ocean with comments on new geographical data. Bulletin du Muséum National d'Histoire Naturelle, ser. Bulletin du Muséum National d'Histoire Naturelle, Paris. ser. 4, section A, 8(4): 757-767

Muricidae
Gastropods described in 1986